6 Draconis is a single-lined spectroscopic binary star system in the northern constellation of Draco, located about 430 light years away from the Sun. It is visible to the naked eye as an orange-hued star with an apparent visual magnitude of 4.95. The system is moving further from the Earth with a heliocentric radial velocity of 3 km/s.

The variable radial velocity of this star system was announced by W. W. Campbell in 1922. Griffin et al. This value provides a lower bound on the actual semimajor axis, which is one half of the longest dimension of their elliptical orbit.

At its estimated distance, this yields a physical size of about 36 times the radius of the Sun. It is radiating 603 times the Sun's luminosity from its enlarged photosphere at an effective temperature of 4,210 K. The companion is most likely an A-type main-sequence star with a class of A8–9 V.

References

K-type giants
A-type main-sequence stars
Spectroscopic binaries
Draco (constellation)
Durchmusterung objects
Draconis, 06
109551
061384
4795